This is a list of interracial romance films.

Films
The films in this list satisfy the following requirements:
 A professional critic or film scholar has identified it as an interracial romance film.
 The film has been released.
 The film is feature length (e.g. not a segment from an anthology).
 The film features a romantic relationship, not just partnering, between people of different races.
 The film's inclusion or casting of interracial romance is not incidental.
 The film is not about romance between species or fictional races (e.g. Star Trek, The Twilight Saga, Shrek).

Notes

References

Book references

External links
 Interracial/Intercultural Marriage, Relationships, and Families Media Resource Center at UC Berkeley
 Gina Marchetti: Romance and the "Yellow Peril"
 University of Florida News: Hollywood films portray biracial couples negatively if shown at all
 Affairs of Race: Interracial Relationships in Film and History - Call for Papers by Cynthia Miller
 Erased Onscreen: Where Are All the Interracial Couples? by The New York Times, March 3, 2017

 
Interracial romance
Interracial romance